The following is a list of flags used to represent Romania.

National flag and state flag

Governmental flags

Military flag

Historical flags

Unofficial flags

Monarchical flags

Military flags of the Kingdom of Romania

Military flags of the Socialist Republic of Romania

Subdivision flags

Political flags

References

Lists and galleries of flags
Flags
Flags
list